

List of Mayors
Following is a list of mayors of the American city of Wichita, Kansas.

Edwin Bird Allen (1871–1872)
James G. Hope (1873–1874)
George E. Harris (1875)
James G. Hope (1876–1877)
William Greiffenstein (1878)
Sol H. Kohn (1879)
William Greiffenstein (1879–1884)
Benajah W. Aldrich (1885–1886)
Joseph P. Allen (1887–1888)
George W. Clement (1889–1890)
John B. Carey (1891–1892)
Lindley Murray Cox (1893–1896)
Finlay Ross (1897–1900)
Benjamin Franklin McLean (1901–1904)
Finlay Ross (1905–1906)
John H. Graham (1907–1908)
Charles Lock Davidson (1909–1910)
William Walter Minick (1911–1912)
William Jasper Babb (1913–1914)
Orsemus Hills Bentley (1915–1916)
Lewis William Clapp (1917–1919)
John Lee Powell (1919–1920)
Wallace C. Kemp (1921–1922)
George Henry Hamilton (1922)
William Coffin Coleman (1922–1923)
Benjamin Franklin McLean (1923–1924)
Frank Leslie Dunn (1924–1925)
Ben F. Copley (1925–1926)
Frank Nighswonger (1926–1927)
A.J. Coombs (1927–1928)
Frank Leslie Dunn (1928–1929)
Charles S. Lawrence (1929–1930)
Herman A. Hill (1930–1931)
Frank Nighswonger (1931–1932)
Harry D. Cottman (1932–1933)
Charles S. Lawrence (1933–1934)
James Schuyler Crawford (1934–1935)
Frank Nighswonger (1935–1936)
Robert E. Israel (1936–1937)
T. Walker Weaver (1937–1938)
Elmer R. Corn (1938–1939)
Frank W. Coleman (1939–1940)
Elmer R. Corn (1940–1941)
John I. Dotson (1941–1942)
Odom Farrell Sullivan (1942–1943)
Eugene Calendar Moriarty (1943–1944)
Herman William Beuttel (1944–1945)
Phil H. Manning (1945–1946)
Frank W. Coleman (1946–1947)
Charles S. Ritchie (1947–1948)
L.A. Donnell (1948–1949)
William Christian Salome, Jr. (1949–1950)
Earl K. Duke (1950–1951)
Floyd Throckmorton Amsden (1951–1952)
Frank Russell Jump (1952–1953)
Walter M. Keeler (1953–1954)
William Christian Salome, Jr. (1954)
L.A. Donnell (1954–1955)
Claude M. DeVorss (1955–1956)
Hugh David Lester (1956)
Alfred E. Howse (1956–1957)
Elzie E. Baird (1957–1958)
James L. Gardner (1958–1959)
Justus H. Fugate (1959–1960)
Levi Budd Rymph (1960–1961)
Herbert Piper Lindsley (1961–1962)
Carl A. Bell, Jr. (1962–1963)
Gerald F. Byrd (1963–1964)
Vincent L. Bogart (1964–1965)
William D. Tarrant (1965–1966)
John S. Stevens (1966–1967)
Clarence Eldert Vollmer (1967–1968)
William D. Anderson, Jr. (1968–1969)
Donald K. Enoch (1969–1970)
A. Price Woodard Jr. (1970–1971), first appointed African–American mayor
Jack H. Greene (1971–1972)
Glenn J. "Jack" Shanahan (1972–1973)
James M. Donnell (1973–1974)
Garry L. Porter (1974–1975)
Connie Ames Peters Kennard (1975–1976)
James M. Donnell (1976–1977)
Antonio F. "Tony" Casado (1977–1978)
Connie Ames Peters Kennard (1978–1979)
Antonio F. "Tony" Casado (1979–1980)
Robert G. Knight (1980–1981)
Robert C. Brown (1981–1982)
Albert J. Kirk (1982–1983)
Margalee Wright (1983–1984)
Robert G. Knight (1984–1985)
Kathlien Robertson Edmiston (1985)
Robert C. Brown (1985–1986)
Antonio F. "Tony" Casado (1986–1987)
Robert G. Knight (1987–1988)
Sheldon Kamen (1988–1989)
Robert G. Knight (1989–1992)
Frank M. Ojile (1992–1993)
Elma Broadfoot (1993–1995)
Robert G. Knight (1995–2003)
Carlos Mayans (2003–2007)
Carl Brewer (2007–2015), first elected African–American mayor
Jeff Longwell (2015–2020)
Brandon Whipple (2020–present)

See also

 List of people from Wichita, Kansas

References

Further reading

Wichita